An Assault Pioneer is an infantry soldier who is responsible for:

 The construction of tools for infantry soldiers to cross natural and man-made obstacles as well as breaching of enemy fortifications;
 Supervising the construction of field defensive works such as bunkers, support weapon firing positions, etc.,;
 The use of demolitions, land mines and booby traps, as well as their clearance; and
 Performing of all other normal infantry duties as the situation requires

Assault Pioneers are lineal descendants of the Pioneers who have formed an essential part of armies since at least the time of the Roman legions. These pioneers were normally employed to march in front of the advancing army, clearing the route as necessary. They could also construct defenses and bivouac facilities. More recently (since the Second World War) assault pioneers have normally formed a Platoon in infantry battalions, and such platoons can be found in a number of British Army and Commonwealth infantry units.  In some of these armies, soldiers serving in the Assault Pioneer Platoon can be identified by a specialist skill badge of two crossed felling axes sewn on their uniforms. These felling axes have traditionally been iconic of the pioneer in various armies throughout history.

The wearing of beards by Assault Pioneers has also been a traditional practice at various times in infantry battalions of British and Commonwealth armies, such as those of Australia and Canada. This tradition began in the French Army (possibly in Napoleonic times) and was one of the dress practices adopted by the British after their defeat of Napoleon in 1815 (along with the Foot  Guards bearskin headdress). In the Australian and Canadian armies, on special occasions some battalions may still parade a ceremonial detachment of assault pioneers in historical uniforms wearing leather aprons, gauntlets and gaiters, and carrying the various tools of their trade such as felling axes, crosscut saws, hatchets and billhooks, picks and shovels.

Assault Pioneers do not replace combat engineers; the latter have a much greater range of skills, capabilities and resources. Instead, Assault Pioneers are intended to provide the infantry battalion with its own integral ("organic") light engineering support in the same sense as the Mortar Platoon provides the same battalion with its own 'organic' indirect fire support. This organic support permits the infantry battalion to conduct operations effectively without relying on the external support of Combat Engineers who are normally subject to a demanding list of priority tasks across the battlefield. On operations Assault Pioneers often work separately in small detachments providing specialist skills, tools and advice to the infantry companies and platoons with those sub-units providing the bulk of the labour.

The term 'Assault Pioneer' reflects the tradition (arising in the First and Second World Wars) of employing these soldiers in the first wave of assaults on fortified enemy positions, using their skills and equipment to support the attacking force in crossing and breaching the enemy's defenses. While Assault Pioneers normally function in a specialist role, they are infantry soldiers first and are fully capable of engaging in combat as needed.

British Army 
During World War II British Army Pioneer Platoons had ten Pioneers plus tradesmen. In 1944 they were renamed Assault Pioneer Platoons and had two Assault Sections plus one Pioneer Section. The five man strong Assault Sections had a jeep and trailer and a 3-ton lorry. The Assault Sections had specialist men and equipment for the disposal of mines and breaching obstacles. The Pioneer Section had eight tradesmen, a mason, a bricklayer and six carpenters. The Pioneer Section was used to turn buildings into accommodation for riflemen; riflemen were the principal unit in the British and American army.

Composition
Assault Section
Commander (Corporal), armed with a rifle 
Driver for Jeep (Private) armed with a Sten submachine gun  
Three Pioneers (Privates) with rifles

Pioneer Section
Pioneer Sergeant (Sergeant) with rifle
Bricklayer (Private), with rifle
Mason (Private), with rifle
Six Carpenters (Privates), with rifles
Driver for 3-ton lorry (Private) with Sten

Modern Usage
In 2019 the Canadian Army decided to bring back assault pioneers to bridge the gap between the Royal Canadian engineers and the infantry. They were also brought back because of experiences from Afghanistan and Operation Athena. 
Units with Assault pioneer platoons
The Royal Canadian Regiment
Royal 22e Régiment
Princess Patricia's Canadian Light Infantry
The Princess Louise Fusiliers
The Hastings and Prince Edward Regiment
 The Seaforth Highlanders of Canada
 Ghurka ARRC Support Battalion

See also
 Pioneer Sergeant
 Combat engineering

References

British Army specialisms
Combat occupations
Military engineering